The 2001 WPA World Nine-ball Championship was the 12th edition of the WPA World Championship for 9-Ball Pool. It took place from July 14 to 22, 2001 in Cardiff, Wales.

Mika Immonen won the event, defeating German Ralf Souquet in the final, winning 17–10.

Format
The 128 participating players were divided into 16 groups, in which they competed in round robin mode against each other. The top four players in each group qualified for the final round played in the knockout system.

Prize money
The event's prize money stayed similar to that of the previous years, with winner Mika Immonen winning $65,000.

Preliminary round
The following 64 players dropped out in the group stage:

Final round

References

External links
Empire Poker WPA World Pool Championship 2001 at azbilliards.com

2001
WPA World Nine-ball Championship
WPA World Nine-ball Championship
International sports competitions hosted by Wales